The Neftchi Baku 2018–19 season is Neftchi Baku's 27th Azerbaijan Premier League season. Neftchi will compete Azerbaijan Premier League and in the Azerbaijan Cup and Europa League.

Season review
On 8 June, Roberto Bordin was announced as Neftçi's new manager on a two-year contract.

On 12 June, Ruslan Abışov, Mahammad Mirzabeyov and Kyrylo Petrov all extended their contract with Neftchi Baku.| 2020

On 17 June, Bagaliy Dabo signed a two-year contract with Neftçi Baku.

On 24 June, Neftchi Baku signed Goran Paracki on a two-year contract from Wellington Phoenix.

On 27 June, Rahman Hajiyev signed a new contract with Neftchi Baku, until the summer of 2020.

On 29 June, Neftchi Baku announced the signing of Kwame Karikari from Al-Arabi on a two-year contract.

On 1 July, Soni Mustivar and Anton Krivotsyuk both signed a one-year extension to their contracts, keeping them at Neftchi Baku until the summer of 2020. The following day, 2 July, Namik Alaskarov also extended his contract until the summer of 2020.

On 8 December, Neftchi announced the signing of Mamadou Mbodj on a 2.5-year contract from FK Žalgiris, and a three-year contract with Mamadou Kane. On 20 December, Rashad Eyyubov had his contract terminated by mutual consent.

On 3 January, Neftchi announce the signing of Turan Valizada from Fenerbahçe on a three-year contract. 4 days later, 7 January, Agil Mammadov returned to Neftchi Baku from Gabala for his third stint with the club, signing an 18-month contract. On 23 January, Vangelis Platellas joined from OFI Crete on an 18-month contract. Slavko Bralić had his contract with Neftchi Baku by mutual agreement on 30 January 2019, whilst on the same day Dário moved to Daegu.
On 2 February, Gianluca Sansone signed a 1.5-year contract with Neftchi Baku.

On 15 February, Petru Racu signed on a contract until the end of the season.

Transfers

In

Out

Loans out

Released

Squad

On loan

Left club during season

Friendlies

Competitions

Premier League

Results summary

Results

League table

Azerbaijan Cup

UEFA Europa League

Qualifying rounds

Squad statistics

Appearances and goals

|-
|colspan="14"|Players away from Neftchi Baku on loan:

|-
|colspan="14"|Players who left Neftchi Baku during the season:

|}

Goal scorers

Disciplinary record

Notes

References

External links 
 Official Website 

Neftçi PFK seasons
Azerbaijani football clubs 2018–19 season
Neftchi